Jang Dong-kyu (born 22 October 1988) is a South Korean professional golfer.

Jang plays on the Korean Tour and the Japan Golf Tour where he has one win, the 2014 Gateway to The Open Mizuno Open. His Mizuno Open win earned him entry into the 2014 Open Championship. He has won once on the Japan Challenge Tour, in 2013, and he also won the 2015 KPGA Championship.

Professional wins (3)

Japan Golf Tour wins (1)

Korean Tour wins (1)

Japan Challenge Tour wins (1)

Results in major championships

CUT = missed the halfway cut

References

External links

South Korean male golfers
Japan Golf Tour golfers
Golfers from Seoul
1988 births
Living people